Edible art refers to food created to be art. It is distinguished from Edible Arrangements (which predominantly consist of fruit) because it is usually more elaborate dessert food. A common form of edible art is wedding cakes, but options for artistic confections range far beyond marital celebrations. Cakes made into art include birthday cakes, cakes for baby showers, for graduation celebrations, and many other types of event. Each piece looks unique, even if created for the same event, because each creator has their own idea in mind when creating their food art. Such pieces of art can be created using a cake base onto which the decorations are placed on, or they can be made purely out of fondant or sugar, while edible, is not created with consumption intended, such as Mexican Calavera.

As an art 
Each graphic artist has their own set of skills in creating their work, but there are several basic starting points for edible dessert art. Most edible art franchises have sheet cakes, cut-out sheet cakes, layered cakes, sculpted cakes, and tiered cakes to choose from as a foundation. One common technique is to airbrush the piece with sugar to enhance its features. Many artists in this field have a degree in fine arts, and participate in freelance decorating.

In popular culture 
Many edible art shops and edible art artists make pieces relating to popular children's movies, books, and television shows.

References

Food and drink preparation
Visual arts